The 1973 U.S. Pro Tennis Championships was a men's tennis tournament played on outdoor hard court at the Longwood Cricket Club in Chestnut Hill, Massachusetts in the United States. The event was classified as a Group B category tournament and was part of the 1973 Grand Prix circuit. It was the 46th edition of the tournament and was held from July 16 through July 23, 1973. Unseeded Jimmy Connors won the singles title and the accompanying $12,000 first prize money.  Due to a rain-delay the final was played on Monday, July 24.

Finals

Singles

 Jimmy Connors defeated  Arthur Ashe 6–3, 4–6, 6–4, 3–6, 6–2
 It was Connors' 7th singles title of the year and the 13th of his career.

Doubles
 Stan Smith /  Erik van Dillen defeated  Ismail El Shafei /  Marty Riessen 4–6, 6–4, 7–5

References

External links
 ITF tournament edition details
 Longwood Cricket Club – list of U.S. Pro Champions

1973
1973 in American tennis
1973 in sports in Massachusetts
July 1973 sports events in the United States
Chestnut Hill, Massachusetts
Hard court tennis tournaments in the United States
History of Middlesex County, Massachusetts
Sports in Middlesex County, Massachusetts
Tennis tournaments in Massachusetts
Tourist attractions in Middlesex County, Massachusetts